Eldred is a rural hamlet (and census-designated place) located in the central part of the town of Highland, Sullivan County, New York, United States. Eldred has a post office, which opened on October 5, 1831, with the current ZIP code as 12732. Other points of interest in the hamlet include the Highland Town Hall, Sunshine Hall Free Library, a firehouse, several churches and parks, and a Dollar General store. Public education in Eldred is serviced through the Eldred Central School District.

References

Hamlets in Sullivan County, New York
Hamlets in New York (state)